"Sharing the Night Together" is a popular song written by Ava Aldridge and Eddie Struzick. Originally recorded by Lenny LeBlanc and then Arthur Alexander in 1976, the song was later a single produced by Ron Haffkine and performed by  rock band Dr. Hook from their album Pleasure and Pain.  Cash Box called Alexander's version "a  languorous ballad plaintive, that should strike deep in the hearts of r&b, pop and MOR listeners" and praised Alexander's "powerful voice" and how he "sings this love song with special emotion." "Sharing the Night Together" also appeared on most of Dr. Hook's following albums including Greatest Hits and Greatest Hits (and More). It reached No. 6 in the U.S. and No. 3 in Canada in 1978, and No. 43 in the UK in 1980.

Chart performance

Weekly singles charts
Arthur Alexander

Lenny LeBlanc

Dr. Hook

Year-end charts

Cover versions
  In 1978, Jamaican singer Delroy Wilson made a reggae version.
 Dobie Gray recorded "Sharing the Night Together" in 1978. It was used as the B-side for his final hit, "You Can Do It" (U.S. No. 37, 1979).
  In 2007, Elliott Yamin included it as a bonus track on his eponymous debut album.
 T-Pain recorded "Sharing the Night Together" for his 2023 covers album On Top of the Covers.

Popular culture
 The song is played in the 2019 Netflix film El Camino: A Breaking Bad Movie; the character Todd Alquist (Jesse Plemons) sings along with his arm hanging out the window, while driving the titular car down the highway.

 Part of the song is played in episode 10 of season 1 of the Syfy television series, Resident Alien.

References

External links
 

Songs about nights
1976 songs
1976 singles
1978 singles
Dr. Hook & the Medicine Show songs
Song recordings produced by Ron Haffkine
Capitol Records singles
EMI Records singles
Arthur Alexander songs
Buddah Records singles
Torch songs